Fin Bell is an English professional footballer who plays as a midfielder for  club Forest Green Rovers.

Career
Bell made his first-team debut for Forest Green Rovers in the EFL Trophy on 6 October 2020, coming on as an 83rd-minute substitute for Josh March in a 3–0 win over West Bromwich Albion U21 at The New Lawn.

Career statistics

References

Living people
English footballers
Association football midfielders
Forest Green Rovers F.C. players
Year of birth missing (living people)